Max Shertz (March 25, 1933 – October 15, 2009) was an  American artist, painter, sculptor, writer, poet, and teacher. Shertz is known for his abstract expressionism style. His works is displayed and collected within museums, public institutions, and by collectors. In protest against the commercialization of the art world, Shertz was reclusive for the last 25 years of his life, and the work Shertz produced during those years has not been released to the public.

Early years

Shertz was born in Brooklyn, to parents who married young and divorced when he was 5 years old. Shertz's maternal family were musicians, his great grandfather, Professor Gottlieb, and his seven children formed a classical ensemble performing all over Europe and in New York.

Shertz demonstrated an interest for art at an early age. At 17 Shertz joined the Marines. After returning from Korea, he studied at the New York Art Students League, where he apprenticed under, and was influenced by, Hans Hofmann and Raphael Soyer, who would later become his close friends. Shertz then moved to Hollywood, where he lived with his uncle, neurosurgeon Daniel Weller, and Weller's wife, columnist writer Helen and sister of Herman Hoover, owner of Ciro's, a famous night club of the 1940s and 1950s. While in Hollywood Shertz worked as an agent and television actor. In 1956 Shertz met his first wife, Edith Tunik (Edi), and they had four children: Marla, Dana, Joshua and Nilda. Disillusioned with show business and drawn to his first love, art, Shertz left Hollywood to devote himself to painting. During that time he apprenticed with the artist Boris Deutsch.

In addition to Hofman and Jackson Pollock, Shertz was also influenced by André Masson, the father of automatism and influential in the American Expressionist movement. Starting in the 1960s, Shertz's work was figurative and abstract expressionist.

Art in America said of Shertz's work in 1972:

The Herald Tribune in 1973 said of Shertz:

Shertz was the first American painter to be exhibited at the Manila Cultural Center of the Philippines. "Festival of the Three Bridges" was commissioned by City Center, Alvin Ailey II in 1971. Although not religious in the traditional sense, his Jewish identity was important to him. He created works related to the Holocaust, including several murals. The "Story of Judaism", a 20-foot mural at Mount Zion Hospital in San Francisco, was dedicated by the late George Moscone in 1976. His artist series portraits, which included Picasso, Braque, Chagall, Masson, Hofmann, Klee, Krasner, Pollock, Gorky, Kandinsky, Miró and Shertz himself, appear on the Nichols Winery Masterpiece Art series wine collections.

Shertz also taught art for more than twenty years. As a teacher, he said: "I want to awaken passion and mysticism, and to establish lost contact with the unique creator, the ever unknown unconscious master who lives next to the soul and spirit. All true art, whether painting, sculpture, writing or poetry emanates from the magic unconscious. How to unleash this magic is never explored by conventional or traditional schools of art."

Throughout the 1970s and 1980s Shertz lived in San Francisco, Los Angeles, and New York. He lived with his wife, Edie, as well as his mistress, muse, and future wife Christiane, whom he had his fifth child with, Jed Shertz.

Shertz eventually divorced Edie and Married his long time companion Christiane in Reno, Nevada.

Reclusive period

In the early 1980s, Shertz grew disenchanted with what he saw as the commercialization of the art world, and was reclusive for the last 25 years of his life. The work Shertz produced during those years has not been released to the public. Shertz did not release his writings, either, including essays "Frontiers of Ecstasy", "Brooklyn Boy", "Portrait of A Man", "Poker Lord", as well as poems.

Shertz's explorations with his art reached Henry Hopkins, the 1990s director of the Los Angeles Hammer Museum, who stated, "Max Shertz with his Art of the Unconscious takes automatism and abstract expressionism to a new dimension making a breakthrough in 20th century art."

Shertz remarked of his own work:

Museums and public acquisitions

 Brooklyn Museum of Art, New York City, New York
 The Royal Family, Their Royal Highness' King Baudouin and Queen Fabiola of Belgium, the Palace

Awards and commendations
 Commendation: President’s Office, State of Israel

References

External links
 Shertz website
 "Max Shertz: Zen Master Artist," November 2010, by Eden Maxwell
 "Keepers of the Flame," January 2011, by Daniel Kaufman

20th-century American painters
American male painters
21st-century American painters
1933 births
2009 deaths
Abstract expressionist artists
Sculptors from New York (state)
Painters from California
20th-century American sculptors
20th-century American male artists
American male sculptors
Sculptors from California